The 1900 North Dakota gubernatorial election was held on November 6, 1900. Republican nominee Frank White defeated Democratic nominee Max Wipperman with 59.20% of the vote.

General election

Candidates
Frank White, Republican
Max Wipperman, Democratic

Results

References

Notes

1900
North Dakota
Gubernatorial